Misjonne Juniffer Naigelino "Sontje" Hansen (born 18 May 2002) is a Dutch professional footballer who plays as a forward for Jong Ajax.

Club career
Hansen made his first-team debut for Ajax on 18 December 2019 in a KNVB Cup match against Telstar. Four days later, he played his first Eredivisie match against ADO Den Haag, coming on as a substitute in the 79th minute.

Career statistics

Honours
Netherlands U17
UEFA European Under-17 Championship: 2019
Individual
 FIFA U-17 World Cup Golden Boot: 2019

 UEFA European Under-17 Championship Team of the Tournament: 2019

References

External links

 Career stats & Profile - Voetbal International

2002 births
Living people
People from Hoorn
Dutch footballers
Netherlands youth international footballers
Association football forwards
Jong Ajax players
AFC Ajax players
Eerste Divisie players
Eredivisie players
Footballers from North Holland
Dutch people of Curaçao descent